"(Love Is) Thicker Than Water" is a song performed by Andy Gibb, released in September 1977 as the second and final single from his debut album, Flowing Rivers. The song was his second single that topped the US Billboard Hot 100. It was mainly written by Barry Gibb, with help from Andy Gibb. The B-side of this song was "Words and Music" in the US, but "Flowing Rivers" in the UK.  It became a gold record.

Billboard magazine describes the song as "a midtempo ballad that changes pace from a lushly romantic and soft [Andy] Gibb vocal to an uptempo instrumental drive. Plenty of melody and another catchy hook".  Cash Box said that "the choral harmonies are full of pop appeal, while the arrangement adds a grandiose touch that will attract more progressive tastes."

Writing and recording
"(Love Is) Thicker Than Water" was written by Barry Gibb in Bermuda with Andy Gibb credited as co-writer. Andy Gibb later revealed writing a song with Barry:

"(Love Is) Thicker than Water" was recorded in October 1976 at the Criteria Studios in Miami, Florida, during the same time as "I Just Want to Be Your Everything".  On the two tracks, Joe Walsh of Eagles played guitar. The song was certified Gold in the United States on 16 February 1978 as Robert Stigwood  presented Gibb with his first gold record at the Roxy in Los Angeles.

Billboard reviewed the song concluding that it has "plenty of melody and another catchy hook." Record World said that it "flows with a light touch and a clever chorus/hook."

Aftermath
As evidence of the Gibb brothers' U.S. chart domination in 1978, atop the March 4, 1978 Hot 100 the Bee Gees' "Stayin' Alive" was displaced by this song, which in turn was displaced two weeks later by the Bee Gees' "Night Fever", which in turn was displaced eight weeks later by Yvonne Elliman's "If I Can't Have You".  Since Barry Gibb had a hand in writing all four of these songs, he became the only person in history to write four consecutive US number-one singles, a feat unmatched to this day.

The song was released in February 1978 in Netherlands.

On October 7, 1977 Andy performed the song, and "I Just Want to Be Your Everything", on The Midnight Special.

Chart performance

Weekly singles charts

Year-end charts

All-time charts

References

External links
 

1976 songs
1977 songs
1977 singles
Andy Gibb songs
Songs written by Barry Gibb
Songs written by Andy Gibb
Song recordings produced by Barry Gibb
Billboard Hot 100 number-one singles
Cashbox number-one singles
RSO Records singles
Disco songs
Funk songs
Soul ballads